Mateusz Górski (born 5 February 2000) is a Polish professional footballer who plays as a goalkeeper for KKS 1925 Kalisz.

Career

At the age of 16, Górski joined the youth academy of Ajax, the Netherlands' most successful club, after trialing for Porto, one of the most successful teams in Portugal.

In 2019, he signed for Polish side Puszcza Niepołomice.

References

External links
 
 

2000 births
Living people
People from Duszniki-Zdrój
Polish footballers
Poland youth international footballers
Association football goalkeepers
I liga players
II liga players
Puszcza Niepołomice players
Polish expatriate footballers
Polish expatriate sportspeople in the Netherlands
Expatriate footballers in the Netherlands